Thiomonas delicata is an As(III)-oxidizing, nonmotile bacterium from the genus Thiomonas. Colonies of T. delicata are whitish-yellow in color.

References

External links
Type strain of Thiomonas delicata at BacDive -  the Bacterial Diversity Metadatabase

Comamonadaceae
Bacteria described in 2006